Roberto Lovato is a journalist, educator, and writer living in San Francisco Bay Area. He is a member of The Grotto, an organization for writers in the San Francisco Bay area. He was a visiting scholar at U.C. Berkeley's Center for Latino Policy Research for three years. Lovato has also received a grant from the Pulitzer Center on Crisis Reporting. His journalistic work spans the entire hemisphere and centers on immigration, the war on drugs, national security, and climate change. His work also explores the links between the online and offline worlds and between storytelling and social movements.

Lovato is a frequent contributor to The Nation, and his work has appeared in numerous publications including The Guardian, Foreign Policy, The Boston Globe, the Associated Press, the Los Angeles Times, the San Francisco Chronicle, Der Spiegel, Al Jazeera, The American Prospect, Mother Jones, Salon, La Opinión, and other national and international media outlets. He has also appeared as either a source or commentator in The New York Times, The Wall Street Journal, Time, The Washington Post, The Economist and Le Monde Diplomatique. He has also appeared on the network news shows of MSNBC, Univision, the BBC, CNN, CNN en Español, NPR, Radio Bilingue, Democracy Now! and Al-Jazeera.

Lovato's article on Juan Crow laws, which analyzed the system used to isolate and control Latinx immigrants, has conceptualized and popularized the term, which is an adaptation of "Jim Crow", the system white Americans used to create a permanent underclass of black Americans. The term "Juan Crow" can be found on banners and websites, in protests and videos and other media across the country, including mention on a segment of The Colbert Report. Lovato's 2005 investigative story about migrant worker exploitation in post-Katrina New Orleans, "Gulf Coast slaves", contributed to a Congressional investigation. 

Lovato has produced programming for NPR, Pacifica Radio, and Univision, where he helped develop and produce Hora Cero, one of the network's first documentary series about immigration in the United States.

Before becoming a journalist, Lovato supported refugee and displaced communities in and from wartime El Salvador as the director of the Central American Resource Center (CARECEN) in Los Angeles. He has been harassed and pursued for his beliefs and work on both sides of the border.

His first book, the memoir, Unforgetting: A Memoir of Family, Migration, Gangs, and Revolution in the Americas, was published in September 2020 from HarperCollins. Publishers Weekly reported it "Mixing fraught reminiscence with vivid reportage."

References

External links

Lovato's 2005 Salon article "Gulf Coast slaves" 
Lovato's article on "Juan Crow" 
Center for Latino Policy Research 
The Grotto website  
CARECEN Los Angeles 

Living people
1963 births
American male journalists
American alternative journalists